Göran Per-Eric "Pelle" Lindbergh (May 24, 1959 – November 11, 1985) was a Swedish professional ice hockey goaltender who played five seasons with the Philadelphia Flyers in the National Hockey League (NHL). He was the first European-born goaltender to be drafted in the NHL Entry Draft and the first to achieve success in North America.

Lindbergh died at age 26 in a single-car accident five months after leading the Flyers to the 1985 Stanley Cup Finals and winning the Vezina Trophy as the NHL's top goaltender.

Playing career
Having gained fame while playing for Hammarby in his youth, and while making his debut in the highest Swedish hockey league with AIK (Stockholm) leading him to the Swedish national team in the 1980 Winter Olympics, Lindbergh set his sights on the North American game. Lindbergh owns the distinction of being the goaltender on the only team that did not lose to the gold-medal-winning Team USA at the 1980 Olympics, as Team Sweden and Team USA played to a 2–2 tie in the first game of the tournament. Team Sweden would go on to win the bronze medal. After being drafted by the Philadelphia Flyers in the 1979 NHL Entry Draft (second round, 35th overall), he started his North American career during the 1980–81 season by playing one and a half seasons for the Maine Mariners of the American Hockey League (AHL) before playing his first games for the Flyers in 1982. In 1983, he was named goaltender of the NHL All-Rookie Team. He led the National Hockey League (NHL) with 40 wins, and games played with 65, he was second in both shutouts (2) and save percentage (.899), and was third in goals against average (3.02) during the 1984–85 season and won the Vezina Trophy, becoming the first European goaltender to do so in NHL history. That same year, he was also named a First Team All-Star. In his final game on November 7, 1985 he made 18 saves in leading the Philadelphia Flyers to 6-2 win over the Chicago Blackhawks.

Death
In the early morning hours of Sunday, November 10, 1985, Lindbergh lost control of his customized Porsche 930 Turbo and struck a wall in front of a Somerdale, New Jersey elementary school, critically injuring himself and severely injuring his two passengers. Although declared brain dead a few hours later, he was kept on life support until his father arrived from Sweden late the next day and his parents quickly gave their permission to pull the plug. He died on Monday, November 11, after a five-hour operation to harvest his heart and other organs for transplant.

At the time of the accident, he had just left the Coliseum, the former practice center for the Flyers located in Voorhees Township, New Jersey, where he was attending a team party. He was intoxicated at the time of the accident, with a blood alcohol level of 0.24, well above New Jersey's legal limit (0.10) at that time.

Lindbergh topped the fan voting for the 1986 NHL All-Star Game. It would mark the first time that a player was chosen posthumously for an all-star team in a major North American team sport. Sean Taylor's selection to the 2008 Pro Bowl was the only other time this has happened. Although his number 31 was never officially retired by the Flyers, no Flyer has worn the number 31 since Lindbergh's death. Lindbergh is buried in Skogskyrkogården, a cemetery in southern Stockholm.

Pelle Circle, a residential street in Far Northeast Philadelphia, was named in his honor when it was constructed in 1986.

In 2006, a Swedish biography entitled Pelle Lindbergh: Behind the White Mask was written by author Thomas Tynander. An English version was published in fall 2009. The English version was translated by Bill Meltzer and published by Middle Atlantic Press.

Awards and achievements
 Named best goaltender at the European Junior Championships in 1976, and 1977.
 Selected to the WJC All-Star team in 1978.
 Named best goaltender at the WJC in 1978.
 Selected to the Swedish World All-Star team in 1979, 1980, and 1983.
 Selected to the AHL first All-Star team in 1981.
 Harry "Hap" Holmes Memorial Award winner in 1981 (shared with Robbie Moore).
 Dudley "Red" Garrett Memorial Award winner in 1981.
 Les Cunningham Award winner in 1981.
 Selected to the NHL All-Rookie Team in 1983.
 Selected to the NHL first All-Star team in 1985.
 Vezina Trophy winner in 1985.
 Played in 1983, 1985 NHL All-Star Games.
 Selected to the 1986 NHL All-Star Game posthumously.
 Swedish Hockey Hall of Fame.

The Philadelphia Flyers named a team award, the Pelle Lindbergh Memorial Trophy, in his honor. Since the 1993–94 season it has been annually awarded to the most improved player on the team.

Career statistics

Regular season and playoffs

International

See also
 List of ice hockey players who died during their playing career

References

External links
 
Official biographical homepage
Flyers History Bio
Spectrum Memories: Lindbergh Memorial at Philadelphiaflyers.com
Pelle Lindbergh in Fatal Car Crash

1959 births
1985 deaths
AIK IF players
Hammarby Hockey (1921–2008) players
Ice hockey players at the 1980 Winter Olympics
Maine Mariners players
Medalists at the 1980 Winter Olympics
National Hockey League All-Stars
Olympic bronze medalists for Sweden
Olympic ice hockey players of Sweden
Olympic medalists in ice hockey
Philadelphia Flyers draft picks
Philadelphia Flyers players
Road incident deaths in New Jersey
Ice hockey people from Stockholm
Springfield Indians players
Swedish expatriate ice hockey players in the United States
Swedish ice hockey goaltenders
Vezina Trophy winners
Burials at Skogskyrkogården